Dong Fang (born 12 February 1981) is a former Chinese badminton player from Shashi, Hubei. Dong represented her country at the 1998 Asian Junior Championships winning a gold in the girls' team event, and two bronze medals in the girls' singles and doubles event. She also claimed the bronze medal in the girls' singles at the 1998 World Junior Championships. She won the senior international tournament at the 2000 German Open, beating her compatriot from Hubei, Hu Ting in straight games. Dong reached the semi-final round at the 2001 Asian Championships, but defeated by Wang Chen of Hong Kong, clinched the bronze medal.

Achievements

Asian Championships 
Women's singles

World Junior Championships 
Girls' singles

Asian Junior Championships 
Girls' singles

Girls' doubles

IBF World Grand Prix
The World Badminton Grand Prix sanctioned by International Badminton Federation (IBF) since 1983.

Women's singles

References

External links
 

1981 births
Living people
Badminton players from Hubei
Chinese female badminton players